The Sphinginae are a subfamily of the hawkmoths (Sphingidae), moths of the order Lepidoptera. The subfamily was first described by Pierre André Latreille in 1802. Notable taxa include the pink-spotted hawkmoth (Agrius cingulata), being a very common and recognizable species, the death's-head hawkmoths (Acherontia species) of Silence of the Lambs fame, and Xanthopan morganii with its enormous proboscis.

Systematics
Tribe Acherontiini
Tribe Sphingini

References 
Sphingidae of the World Checklist, All-Leps Barcode of Life

 
Sphingidae